Zoar is a historic farmstead and national historic district located within Zoar State Forest near the Aylett community of King William County, Virginia, United States. It is also known as Mount Zoar, Upper Zoar, and Lower Zoar. The district encompasses 6 contributing buildings and 2 contributing sites.  The main house was built in 1901, and is a 1 1/2-story Queen Anne style single-family frame dwelling. Associated with the house are the contributing smokehouse, kitchen / servant's quarters, dairy, corn crib and barn, horsefield, and family cemetery.

It was listed on the National Register of Historic Places in 2007.

References

Farms on the National Register of Historic Places in Virginia
Historic districts on the National Register of Historic Places in Virginia
Queen Anne architecture in Virginia
Houses completed in 1901
Houses in King William County, Virginia
National Register of Historic Places in King William County, Virginia